The Fiji Pro 2015 was an event of the Association of Surfing Professionals for 2015 ASP World Tour.

This event was held from 07 to 19 June at Namotu, (Tavarua, Fiji) and opposed by 36 surfers.

The tournament was won by Owen Wright (AUS), who beat Julian Wilson (AUS) in the final, becoming the first surfer to score 20.00 points (the maximum possible) in two heats of a single ASP World Tour event.

Round 1

Round 2

Round 3

Round 4

Round 5

Quarter finals

Semi finals

Final

References

2015 World Surf League
Fiji Pro
2015 in Fijian sport
Sport in Fiji
June 2015 sports events in Oceania